Adoxophyes congruana is a species of moth of the family Tortricidae. It is found in China.

References

Moths described in 1863
Adoxophyes
Moths of Asia